The 1957 Iowa Hawkeyes football team represented the University of Iowa in the 1957 Big Ten Conference football season.

Schedule

Roster

Rankings

Game summaries

Utah State

Washington State

Indiana

Wisconsin

Northwestern

Michigan

Minnesota

Ohio State

    
    
    
    
    

Game Statistics

Notre Dame

Postseason awards
Alex Karras - Outland Trophy, Consensus First-team All-American, 2nd in Heisman Trophy voting

1958 NFL Draft

References

Iowa
Iowa Hawkeyes football seasons
Iowa Hawkeyes football